Amirgadh is a town in Banaskantha district in the Indian state of Gujarat.

Demographics
 India census, Amirgadh had a population of 6,201. Males constitute 51.23% of the population and females 48.77%. Amirgadh has an average literacy rate of 76.24%: male literacy is 86.02%, and female literacy is 66.14%. In Amirgadh, 14.42% of the population is under 6 years of age.

Transport

Railway
Shri Amirgadh railway station is located on the Western Railway Ahmedabad – Jaipur Segment. It is 35 km from Palanpur, 168 km from Ahmedabad.

References

Cities and towns in Banaskantha district